Ramsay’s Kitchen Nightmares is a television programme featuring British celebrity chef Gordon Ramsay first broadcast on  Channel 4 in 2004.

In each episode, Ramsay visits a failing restaurant and acts as a troubleshooter to help improve the establishment in just one week.  Ramsay revisits the restaurant a few months later to see how business has fared in his absence. Episodes from series one and two have been re-edited with additional new material as Ramsay’s Kitchen Nightmares Revisited; they featured Ramsay checking up on restaurants a year or more after he attended to them.

An American adaptation of this show, titled Kitchen Nightmares, debuted 19 September 2007 on Fox. It is broadcast in the UK on Channel 4 as Ramsay’s Kitchen Nightmares USA to avoid confusion with the original title. Its run ended on 12 September 2014.

In October 2009, Ramsay announced that after his four-year contract expired in 2011 he would not continue with Kitchen Nightmares and would instead work on his other shows. Despite this, the show returned for one last series in 2014 (retitled as Ramsay's Costa del Nightmares) where Ramsay visited and helped failing restaurants owned by Britons abroad. The final series also coincided with the ending of the US version. The show has won BAFTA and Emmy awards.

Series overview

Episodes

Series 1

Series 2

Series 3

Series 4

Series 5

Ramsay’s Great British Nightmare
A one-off, two-hour special entitled Ramsay’s Great British Nightmare was broadcast on 30 January 2009 as part of The Great British Food Fight, a two-week series of food-related programming on Channel 4. In the programme, Ramsay campaigned for viewers to start supporting local restaurants, especially in a bad economy.

Ramsay’s Costa del Nightmares

Libel
In June 2006, Ramsay won a High Court case against the Evening Standard, which had alleged that scenes and the general condition of the restaurant had been faked for the first episode of Ramsay’s Kitchen Nightmares. These allegations followed reports from the previous owner of Bonapartes, Sue Ray. Ramsay was awarded £75,000 plus costs. Ramsay said at the time: "I won't let people write anything they want to about me. We have never done anything in a cynical, fake way."

Reception

The programme received favourable reviews for its in-depth look into the restaurant industry.  Jane Redfem of Off the Telly commented that the show "could have been cynically designed to exploit Ramsay’s foul-mouthed reputation... But watch, listen and think about what he is saying, and his genuine commitment to his profession in general, and the task at hand become abundantly evident."  Lorna Martin of The Observer said "Ramsay’s Kitchen Nightmares is compulsive viewing – packed with excitement, emotion and entertainment."
Slate's Sara Dickerman was impressed by the show's "economic realism" in the tired food television genre.  She wrote, "There is something refreshing about a show that doesn't promise a ticket to ride (a surgical makeover, a million dollars, Richard Branson's job) but instead offers restaurant owners the hope—if they seriously reform their establishments—that they might, just might, break even for the next few months."

Ramsay’s Kitchen Nightmares was named Best Feature at the 2005 and 2008 BAFTA awards.  It also earned the 2006 International Emmy for best non-scripted entertainment.

DVD releases

United States
On 3 March 2009, Acorn Media released series 1 of Ramsay’s Kitchen Nightmares on DVD in the US.  Series 2 was released on 1 September 2009. Ramsay's Kitchen Nightmares DVD news: Box Art for Ramsay's Kitchen Nightmares - The Complete Series 2 | TVShowsOnDVD.com

Canada
For the Canadian market, Visual Entertainment has released the first three series of Ramsay’s Kitchen Nightmares on DVD in two volume sets.

International versions

 Currently airing franchise
 An upcoming season
 Franchise no longer in production

References

External links
 Ramsay’s Kitchen Nightmares at Channel4.com
 Ramsay’s Kitchen Nightmares at IMDb
 Ramsay’s Kitchen Nightmares at BBC America
 Ramsay’s Kitchen Nightmares at Food Network Canada

2004 British television series debuts
2014 British television series endings
2000s British reality television series
2010s British reality television series
Business-related television series in the United Kingdom
Channel 4 reality television shows
English-language television shows
Food reality television series
International Emmy Award for Best Non-Scripted Entertainment winners
Television series by All3Media
Workplace television series
2000s British cooking television series
2010s British cooking television series